Kingston is a village in Tuscola County in the U.S. state of Michigan. The population was 440 at the 2010 census. The village is located at the southern edge of Kingston Township and is partially within Koylton Township.

Geography

Demographics

2010 census
As of the census of 2010, there were 440 people, 163 households, and 120 families living in the village. The racial makeup of the village was 96.1% White, 0.5% African American, 0.7% Native American, 0.7% from other races, and 2.0% from two or more races. Hispanic or Latino of any race were 3.6% of the population.

There were 163 households, of which 37.4% had children under the age of 45 living with them, 53.4% were married couples living together, 15.3% had a female householder with no husband present, 4.9% had a male householder with no wife present, and 26.4% were non-families. 20.9% of all households were made up of individuals, and 11.1% had someone living alone who was 65 years of age or older. The average household size was 2.70 and the average family size was 3.10.

The median age in the village was 35 years. 26.1% of residents were under the age of 18; 10.7% were between the ages of 18 and 24; 25.3% were from 25 to 44; 23.6% were from 45 to 64; and 14.3% were 65 years of age or older. The gender makeup of the village was 50.2% male and 49.8% female.

2000 census
As of the census of 2000, there were 450 people, 169 households, and 124 families living in the village. The racial makeup of the village was 94.67% White, 0.67% African American, 0.22% Native American, 0.22% Asian, 0.89% from other races, and 3.33% from two or more races. Hispanic or Latino of any race were 2.44% of the population.

There were 169 households, out of which 37.9% had children under the age of 45 living with them, 56.2% were married couples living together, 15.4% had a female householder with no husband present (there is no percentage of male householder with no wife present listed), and 26.6% were non-families. 22.5% of all households were made up of individuals, and 15.4% had someone living alone who was 65 years of age or older.  The average household size was 2.66 and the average family size was 3.07.

In the village, the population was spread out, with 30.2% under the age of 18, 8.9% from 18 to 24, 27.8% from 25 to 44, 20.2% from 45 to 64, and 12.9% who were 65 years of age or older.  The median age was 35 years. For every 100 females, there were 89.9 males.  For every 100 females age 18 and over, there were 82.6 males.

The median income for a household in the village was $32,813, and the median income for a family was $42,500. Males had a median income of $35,938 versus $20,750 for females. The per capita income for the village was $14,753.  About 6.8% of families and 6.5% of the population were below the poverty line, including 7.4% of those under age 18 and 8.9% of those age 65 or over.

Notable people
Murray Van Wagoner (1898–1986), 38th Governor of Michigan

References

Villages in Michigan
Villages in Tuscola County, Michigan